I Had a Comrade (German:Ich hatt' einen Kameraden) is a 1924 German silent film directed by Hans Behrendt and starring Otto Gebühr.

Cast
Otto Gebühr
Peter Berneis
Gertrud Eysoldt 
Charlotte Klinder

References

External links

1924 films
Films of the Weimar Republic
Films directed by Hans Behrendt
German silent feature films
German black-and-white films